Praemachiloides is a genus of jumping bristletails in the family Machilidae. There are about five described species in Praemachiloides.

Species
These five species belong to the genus Praemachiloides:
 Praemachiloides autunnalis Gaju, Bach, Mora & Molero, 1995
 Praemachiloides iberica Mora, Gaju & Bach, 2000
 Praemachiloides insularis Gaju, Bach, Molero & Mora, 1995
 Praemachiloides janetscheki Bach, 1978
 Praemachiloides trispina Janetschek, 1954

References

Further reading

 
 
 
 
 

Archaeognatha
Articles created by Qbugbot